Iola High School is a public high school located in Iola, Texas (USA) and classified as a 2A school by the UIL. It is a part of the Iola Independent School District located in northwest Grimes County. In 2015, the school was rated "Met Standard" by the Texas Education Agency.

Athletics

The Iola Bulldogs compete in these sports - 
 
Baseball
Basketball
Football
Softball
Track and Field
Volleyball

State Titles
Volleyball - 
2015(2A)
2016(2A)
2020 (2A)

State Finalist

Volleyball 
2007(1A), 2008(1A), 2011(1A)

References

External links
Iola ISD

Schools in Grimes County, Texas
Public high schools in Texas